John Bitterley (died c. 1396) was the member of the Parliament of England for Salisbury for the parliaments of January 1377, January 1380, February 1383, April 1384, February 1388, January 1390, 1393, and 1394. He was also mayor of Salisbury.

References 

Members of Parliament for Salisbury
14th-century English politicians
English MPs January 1377
English MPs January 1380
English MPs February 1383
English MPs April 1384
English MPs February 1388
English MPs January 1390
English MPs 1393
English MPs 1394
Year of birth unknown
Year of death uncertain
1390s deaths
Mayors of Salisbury